The regions of Greece are the country's thirteen first-level administrative entities, each comprising several second-level units, originally known as prefectures and, since 2011, as regional units.

History
The current regions were established in July 1986 (the presidential decree officially establishing them was signed in 1987), by decision of the interior minister, Menios Koutsogiorgas, as second-level administrative entities, complementing the prefectures (Law 1622/1986). Before 1986, there was a traditional division into broad historical–geographical regions (γεωγραφικά διαμερίσματα), which, however, was often arbitrary; not all of the pre-1986 traditional historical-geographic regions had official administrative bodies. Although the post-1986 regions were mostly based on the earlier divisions, they are usually smaller and, in a few cases, do not overlap with the traditional definitions: for instance, the region of Western Greece, which had no previous analogue, comprises territory belonging to the Peloponnese peninsula and the traditional region of Central Greece.

As part of a decentralization process inspired by Interior Minister Alekos Papadopoulos, they were accorded more powers in the 1997 Kapodistrias reform of local and regional government. They were transformed into fully separate entities by the 2010 Kallikratis Plan (Law 3852/2010), which entered into effect on 1 January 2011. In the 2011 changes, the government-appointed general secretary (γενικός γραμματέας) was replaced with a popularly elected regional governor (περιφερειάρχης) and a regional council (περιφερειακό συμβούλιο) with 5-year terms. Many powers of the prefectures, which were also abolished or reformed into regional units, were transferred to the region level. The regional organs of the central government were in turn replaced by seven decentralized administrations, which group from one to three regions under a government-appointed general secretary.

List of regions

Bordering the region of Central Macedonia there is one autonomous region, Mount Athos (Agion Oros, or "Holy Mountain"), an autonomous monastic community under Greek sovereignty. It is located on the easternmost of the three large peninsulas jutting into the Aegean from the Chalkidiki peninsula.

See also

 Administrative divisions of Greece
 ISO 3166-2:GR
 List of Greek regions by Human Development Index

References 

 
Subdivisions of Greece
 
Greece 1
regions, Greece
Greece geography-related lists
1987 establishments in Greece